I mostri oggi is a 2009 Italian sketch comedy film directed by Enrico Oldoini.

The film is a tribute to Dino Risi's classic comedies I mostri and I nuovi mostri.

Cast

References

External links
 

2009 films
Films directed by Enrico Oldoini
2000s Italian-language films
2009 comedy films
Italian comedy films
Sketch comedy films
Warner Bros. films
2000s Italian films